Stucki is a Swiss surname. Notable people with the surname include:

Daniel Stucki (born 1981), Swiss football player
Lorna Stucki, British singer

It may also be an alternative spelling of Stuckey (surname)

Surnames of Swiss origin